N'Golo Kanté (born 29 March 1991) is a French professional footballer who plays as a defensive midfielder for  club Chelsea and the France national team. Considered by many to be one of the world's best midfielders, Kanté is widely praised for his work rate and defensive acumen.

Kanté made his senior professional debut with Boulogne in 2012, appearing as a substitute in one Ligue 2 match, and played an entire season in the third division the following year. After that he joined Ligue 2 side Caen on a free transfer, finished third and won promotion to Ligue 1. He stayed with the club for one more year. In 2015, Kanté joined Leicester City for a fee worth £5.6 million.

Kanté was an integral part of the Leicester City team that went on to become surprise Premier League champions in 2016. The following year, he joined Chelsea for a fee worth £32 million and again won the league, making him the first outfield player to win consecutive English league titles with different clubs since Eric Cantona in 1992 and 1993. With Chelsea he has won the FA Cup, the UEFA Europa League, the UEFA Champions League, the UEFA Super Cup, and the FIFA Club World Cup. Individually, Kante has been awarded the Premier League Player of the Season, the PFA Players' Player of the Year, the FWA Footballer of the Year, the UEFA Men's Midfielder of the year and the Trophées UNFP for Best French Player Abroad twice.

Kanté made his senior international debut for France in 2016 and was included in the squad that finished runners-up at the 2016 European Championship. In 2017, Kanté was named the French Player of the Year, a first for a player from the Premier League in seven years, and twelve months later was a key member of the 2018 FIFA World Cup winning squad.

Club career

Boulogne
Born in Paris to Malian parents, Kanté began his career at the age of eight at JS Suresnes, in the western suburbs of the capital, remaining there for a decade. According to assistant manager Pierre Ville, Kanté remained outside the radar of big teams because of his small stature and selfless styles of play. He was rejected from the academy at Clairefontaine during this time. In 2010, after Arsenal manager Arsène Wenger passed on the offer of signing Kanté, Suresnes' president (one of Wenger's best friends) personally drove him around to visit different clubs. He joined the reserve team of Boulogne, and made his professional debut in the last game of the Ligue 2 season on 18 May 2012, a 1–2 home defeat for his already relegated team to Monaco. He replaced Virgile Reset for the final 11 minutes.

During the 2012–13 season, he played in the third-tier Championnat National, missing only one league game. On 10 August, he scored his first senior goal, the only one in a win over Luzenac at the Stade de la Libération, and he added two more over the campaign.

Caen

In 2013, he joined Ligue 2 side Caen and played all 38 games in his first season as they came third in Ligue 2, earning them promotion to Ligue 1. In his second match on 9 August, he scored his first goal to equalise in a 2–1 win at Laval; he levelled again with his other goal of the campaign on 11 April 2014, in a 3–2 win at Istres.

The following season, Kanté played 37 games as Caen remained in the top flight; his one absence was suspension through being sent off in a 0–1 home loss to Rennes on 30 August. Three weeks earlier, he scored their first goal of the season in a 3–0 win at Evian. He recovered the ball more times over the season than any other player in Europe.

Leicester City
Kanté was scouted for Premier League club Leicester City by Steve Walsh, who had previously facilitated the transfers of Jamie Vardy and Riyad Mahrez to the team. He was identified as the successor to Esteban Cambiasso. On 3 August 2015, he joined Leicester on a four-year contract, for an undisclosed fee reported to be worth €8 million (£5.6 million). He made his debut five days later by replacing Vardy for the final eight minutes of a 4–2 home win over Sunderland. On 7 November, he scored his first Premier League goal in a 2–1 home win against Watford.

He earned much praise and many plaudits for his consistently impressive displays for Leicester, and was widely considered to be a major factor in the club's excellent form as they went on to win the 2015–16 Premier League, consistently making a high number of tackles and interceptions. In April, he was one of four Leicester players named in the PFA Team of the Year. By the end of the season, Kanté had managed 175 tackles (31 more than any other player) and 157 interceptions (15 more than any other player), topping the defensive stats at the end of the 2015–16 Premier League season.

Chelsea

2016–18: League and FA Cup champion

On 16 July 2016, Kanté signed a five-year deal with Chelsea who reportedly paid £32 million in transfer fees. Arsenal allegedly backed out of the deal due to agent fees involved which totaled more than £10 million, instead opting to sign Granit Xhaka. Due to disputes arising from the sharing of agent fees, Kanté was reported to have been subject to death threats, a claim which he later denied.  Kanté was given the number 7 shirt, left vacant since the exit of Ramires in January. According to Football Leaks, Chelsea offered to transfer a part of the salary into an offshore account to avoid taxes. Kanté refused with his lawyer stating in an email: "N'Golo is flexible, he simply wants a normal salary."

On 15 August 2016, Kanté made his competitive debut in their season opener against West Ham United. Despite picking up a yellow card in the first three minutes of the game, he shone as the game went on, to help Chelsea to a 2–1 victory. Three months after his move to London, he faced his former side, Leicester City for the first time, and was Man of the Match in a 3–0 victory. On 23 October, he scored his first goal for Chelsea in a 4–0 home win against Manchester United.

On 26 December 2016, Kanté was named by L'Équipe as the world's sixth best footballer of 2016. On 13 March 2017, Kanté was named man of the match and scored the only goal in the 51st minute, in an FA Cup quarter-final win over Manchester United at Stamford Bridge. On 20 April, Kanté was named in the PFA Team of the Year for the second consecutive season. He was also later named the PFA Players' Player of the Year, the FWA Footballer of the Year, and the Premier League Player of the Season. Kanté become the first player since Eric Cantona in 1993 to win back‑to-back top-flight titles in England with two clubs. Kanté was nominated for the Ballon d'Or in October 2017. He would go on to gain an FA Cup winners medal, appearing for the whole 90 minutes in a 1–0 victory over Manchester United in the final on 19 May 2018. BBC Sport awarded him the man of the match award.

2018–22: European and World champion
He signed a new five-year contract at Chelsea on 23 November 2018, making him Chelsea's highest paid player. Kanté scored the first goal of Chelsea's 2–1 EFL Cup semi-final second leg win at home to Tottenham Hotspur. The score was tied 2–2 on aggregate at the end of 90 minutes, with Chelsea winning the shootout 4–2. Kanté scored on his 300th club appearance, a 2–2 home draw against Burnley on 22 April. Despite not being fully fit, Kanté started the 2018–19 Europa League final and dominated Arsenal's midfield as Chelsea won 4–1.

Kanté started the 2019 Premier League campaign from the bench as Chelsea suffered a 4–0 away defeat to Manchester United. He has been out for almost a month including missing the Champions League opener against Valencia because of ankle injury. Kanté scored the only goal in a 1–2 loss against Liverpool at Stamford Bridge on 22 September 2019. His first goal of the season was nominated for the Premier League Goal of the Month award along with his Chelsea teammate, Fikayo Tomori. Kanté marked his 150th Chelsea appearance with a goal against Manchester City, in a 1–2 away defeat on 23 November. Later that month Kanté revealed he decided against moving to PSG and said, "‘Sometimes we do not necessarily know where we want to go, but we know what we have." He said he felt good in London and had faith in the project at Chelsea.

In May 2020 during the COVID-19 pandemic, Kanté chose to train from home after Chelsea resumed training on site. The club supported his stance, even if he would miss the rest of the season. Kanté impressed in the Premier League opener against Brighton & Hove Albion, in a 3–1 away win on 14 September 2020.

He marked his 200th appearance in all competitions with the club 23 February 2021 as Chelsea beat Atlético Madrid 1–0 in the Champions League round of 16. Kanté was widely lauded for his performances against the Spanish sides, Atlético Madrid and Real Madrid, en-route to the final of the Champions League. He was named man of the match as he won his first UEFA Champions League after Chelsea defeated Manchester City 1–0 in the 2021 UEFA Champions League Final in Porto. Arsène Wenger described Kanté's performance as "unbelievable", and commentators argued that Kanté's performance in the Champions League put him in contention for the 2021 Ballon d’Or. In anticipation of the award Kante said that "it's a great individual award for players, but I see it as the result of a season. It's not necessarily an objective I'm working on."

After Kanté's match-winning performances in Chelsea's run up to the final of the 2020–21 UEFA Champions League season, several pundits proclaimed him as the apparent successor to former France and Chelsea player Claude Makélélé, who is considered to be one of the best defensive midfielders of all time. For his performances throughout the season, Kanté was named the UEFA Men's Midfielder of the year on 26 August 2021, but lost out to Chelsea teammate Jorginho in the UEFA Men's Player of the Year Award.

In later September 2021, Kanté tested positive for COVID-19 amid its pandemic, and was required to self-isolate for 10 days. On 8 October, Kanté was one of five Chelsea players included in the final 30-man shortlist for the 2021 Ballon d'Or. On 13 February 2022, he helped Chelsea to their first Club World Cup triumph in a 2–1 win over Palmeiras.

International career

Born to Malian parents, Kanté was approached by Mali ahead of the 2015 Africa Cup of Nations having not played for France in any of their age group teams. Kanté declined on the basis that he was still trying to establish himself in Ligue 1. Mali issued a further invitation to Kanté in January 2016, although he stated that he was still undecided about which national team to represent should he get an invite from France.

On 17 March 2016, Kanté was selected for the France senior squad for the first time to face the Netherlands and Russia in friendlies. He made his debut against the former eight days later, replacing Lassana Diarra at half time in a 3–2 win at the Amsterdam Arena. On his 25th birthday, 29 March, he made his first start and scored to open a 4–2 win over Russia at the Stade de France; fellow birthday celebrant Dimitri Payet also scored.

On 10 June 2016, Kanté appeared in his first competitive match for France by starting the opening match of Euro 2016 against Romania; he played the entire match, made the most passes, the most tackles, the most interceptions, covered the most distance on the pitch and assisted Dimitri Payet's winning goal in a 2–1 victory. In the round of 16 match against the Republic of Ireland at the Parc Olympique Lyonnais, Kanté picked up a yellow card in the 27th minute (his second of Euro 2016 which would cause him to be suspended from the quarter-final) and was replaced with Kingsley Coman in the 46th minute with the French trailing 0–1 at half time. Kanté was unused in the final, which France lost 1–0 to Portugal after extra time.

On 17 May 2018, he was called up to the 23-man French squad for the 2018 FIFA World Cup in Russia by manager Didier Deschamps. He featured in all 7 matches for France in the tournament. He was awarded man-of-the-match in a 0–0 draw against Denmark in the final match of the group stage on 26 June, and on 15 July, Kanté started in France's 4–2 win over Croatia in the final of the tournament.

In May 2021, Kanté was called up for the France squad for UEFA Euro 2020.

Kanté missed the 2022 FIFA World Cup as he recovered from a serious hamstring injury.

Player profile

Style of play
A dynamic, diminutive, and disciplined player, Kanté is known for his relentless energy and excellent ball-winning abilities as a box-to-box midfielder in the centre of the pitch. This is attributed to his strong positional sense, off the ball movement, and ability to read the game. Predominantly known for his tactical awareness, intelligence, anticipation, and the defensive aspect of his game—his ability to tackle and regain possession, intercept passes, and block shots—Kanté is also capable of playmaking from inside his own half and is an efficient passer on the counter-attack, helping kick start attacking plays immediately after winning back the ball. He is also quick up and down the pitch and often makes late attacking runs in to the box. A late bloomer, by the age of 21, Kanté had only made one senior appearance in the second tier of French football. He credits his calm and composed demeanor on the pitch to his gradual rise through three levels in the football league pyramid.

Kanté cites Lassana Diarra and Claude Makélélé, with whom he is often compared, as inspirations but insists he has his own style and approach towards the game, one which is unconventional and described as "false four", "relayeur", "carrilero", and "mezzala". His game is considered as, or tasked with, doing the "dirty work", which includes running, fetching, and retrieving possession. Though Kanté does not necessarily enjoy his role, he once said, "[the] satisfaction in recovering a ball, in protecting my team from an opponent's attack" is what keeps him going. Kanté made the most tackles in Europe's top leagues in back-to-back seasons (14–15 and 15–16). In his first 150 Premier League appearances he totaled 92 wins, 28 losses and 10 goals. In five years, in the Premier League, he has yet to receive a red card.

Under Chelsea manager Maurizio Sarri, Kanté was deployed in a more advanced midfield roleone that he previously played in at Leicestershowcasing his effectiveness in possession and ball-carrying duties. In 2021, Tuchel restored Kanté in a "double six" holding midfield role to great effect, predominantly on the right-hand side, and usually partnered either by Jorginho or Mateo Kovačić. Kanté was effective in both disrupting an opponent's possession play in the final-third as well as springing swift counter-attacks from the midfield.

Reception

In April 2016, Sir Alex Ferguson hailed Kanté as the best player in the Premier League, while the following year, former Chelsea midfielder Frank Lampard labelled him the best central midfielder in the world. His World Cup winning midfield partner, Paul Pogba, said he could outrun an entire team of 11 players. His league-title winning manager, Claudio Ranieri, often joked about him having "batteries" and said: "One day, I'm going to see you cross the ball and then finish the cross with a header yourself." Thomas Tuchel, with whom Kanté won the 2020–21 Champions League, said, "If you play with N'Golo you have half a man more; this is unique. It is a pleasure to be his coach, he is a big gift for me, a guy so, so humble and who is such a big helper on the pitch." Off the pitch, Kanté's former Chelsea manager, Antonio Conte, praised his work ethic and constant willingness to improve. A popular Internet meme that 70% of the planet is covered by water and the rest by the Kanté twins exemplifies his standing among the fans and their recognition of his work ethic and reading of the game.

Personal life
Kanté is a practising Muslim. He was born in Paris to Malian parents who migrated to France from Mali in 1980. He grew up in a small apartment in Rueil-Malmaison, Hauts-de-Seine. His father died shortly after N'Golo turned 11 and his elder sibling Niama died of a heart attack before the 2018 World Cup.

He is named after King Ngolo Diarra of the Bamana Empire. His younger sister was also in the youth system at Suresnes.  Ronaldo, Ronaldinho and Diego Maradona were his favorite players growing up. At the age of 21, while playing for Boulogne, he earned a diploma in vocational accounting.

At the start of his professional career at Boulogne, he commuted to training on a kick scooter and as of 2018 drove a Mini Hatch—his first purchase in England because he found it easy to learn to drive in.  Kanté is aware of his public perception as a shy and private individual, but also said that stories about him by current and former teammates, like Jamie Vardy, were often exaggerated.

Kanté's nickname is "NG," and outside of football, he enjoys playing tennis. His go-to karaoke song is Vegedream's "Ramenez la coupe à la maison". During his initiation at Chelsea, which he described as a "stressful moment," his teammates said he was not loud enough. His favourite dish is thieboudienne because of his mother's cooking.

Career statistics

Club

International

As of match played 3 June 2022. France score listed first, score column indicates score after each Kanté goal.

Honours
Leicester City
Premier League: 2015–16

Chelsea
Premier League: 2016–17
FA Cup: 2017–18; runner-up: 2016–17, 2019–20, 2020–21, 2021–22
UEFA Champions League: 2020–21
UEFA Europa League: 2018–19
UEFA Super Cup: 2021
FIFA Club World Cup: 2021
EFL Cup runner-up: 2018–19, 2021–22

France
FIFA World Cup: 2018
UEFA European Championship runner-up: 2016

Individual
PFA Team of the Year: 2015–16 Premier League, 2016–17 Premier League
ESM Team of the Year: 2015–16, 2016–17
Leicester City Players' Player of the Year: 2015–16
L'Équipe Team of the Year: 2016, 2017, 2018
PFA Players' Player of the Year: 2016–17
Premier League Player of the Season: 2016–17
FWA Footballer of the Year: 2016–17
Chelsea Players' Player of the Year: 2016–17
Chelsea Player of the Year: 2017–18
Trophées UNFP for Best French Player Abroad: 2017, 2018
French Player of the Year: 2017
FIFA FIFPro World11: 2018, 2021 
UEFA Team of the Year: 2018
UEFA Europa League Squad of the Season: 2018–19
UEFA Champions League Squad of the Season: 2020–21
UEFA Champions League Midfielder of the Season: 2020–21

Orders
Knight of the Legion of Honour: 2018

References

External links

 Profile at the Chelsea F.C. website
 
 
 
 

1991 births
Living people
Footballers from Paris
French footballers
France international footballers
Association football midfielders
US Boulogne players
Stade Malherbe Caen players
Leicester City F.C. players
Chelsea F.C. players
Ligue 2 players
Championnat National players
Ligue 1 players
Premier League players
FA Cup Final players
UEFA Europa League winning players
UEFA Champions League winning players
UEFA Euro 2016 players
2018 FIFA World Cup players
UEFA Euro 2020 players
FIFA World Cup-winning players
French expatriate footballers
Expatriate footballers in England
French expatriate sportspeople in England
Chevaliers of the Légion d'honneur
Black French sportspeople
French Muslims
French people of Malian descent